Pantego Academy Historic Museum or Ye Olde Academy is a museum in an old academy in Pantego, North Carolina that has ceased operations. It was registered as a National Historic Place on October 25, 1984.

References

External links
 

School buildings on the National Register of Historic Places in North Carolina
Museums in Beaufort County, North Carolina
History museums in North Carolina
National Register of Historic Places in Beaufort County, North Carolina